Kemnay Academy is a secondary school in Kemnay, Aberdeenshire, situated on the banks of the River Don. It is one of seventeen secondary schools run by Aberdeenshire Council and has roughly 820 pupils. The current rector is Lizbeth Paul, who took up post in August 2015.

History
Built in 1980 and opened in 1982, Kemnay Academy was initially created in response to a growing need for a secondary school to accommodate the growing number of pupils in Kintore and Kemnay who previously went to Inverurie Academy. After its construction, Kemnay Academy originally served the surrounding Kemnay and Kintore communities and their three feeder primary schools (Kintore Primary, Kemnay Primary, Alehousewells Primary). At the turn of the century, Kemnay Academy began accepting pupils from the neighbouring Kinellar Primary School in Blackburn. A second primary school in Kintore, Midmill School, was opened in November 2016 and became the fifth feeder school to Kemnay Academy.

In June 2015, Former Provost of Aberdeenshire Jill Webster officially opened the school's new £14.3 million extension. It included a new gym, a music room, biomass heating plant, additional support for learning facilities and extra classroom space.

In 2023, plans for a new 16-bay bus park at the school were approved.

Notable former pupils

Evan Duthie - DJ
Darren Mackie - Former Aberdeen F.C. and Turriff United F.C. professional footballer
Paul Lawrie - Golfer

External links

References 

Secondary schools in Aberdeenshire
Educational institutions established in 1982
1982 establishments in Scotland